Moldovan music is closely related to that of its neighbour and cultural kin, Romania.  Moldovan folk is known for swift, complex rhythms (a characteristic shared with many Eastern European traditions), musical improvisation, syncopation and much melodic ornamentation.  Pop, hip hop, rock and other modern genres have their own fans in Moldova as well.  Modern pop stars include O-Zone, a Romanian and Moldovan band whose "Dragostea din tei" was a major 2004 European hit, guitarist and songwriter Vladimir Pogrebniuc, Natalia Barbu, who is well known in Germany, Romania and Ukraine, and Nelly Ciobanu.  The band Flacai became well known in the 1970s across Moldova, turning their hometown of Cahul into an important center of music.

Folk music
During the Soviet era, Moldovan folk culture flourished, and was strongly promoted by the government.  However, many elements were altered to obscure the shared history of Romania and Moldova, because the Soviet Union wanted to discourage secession.

The Mioriţa is ancient ballad that is a very important part of Moldovan folk culture.

Popular Moldovan musicians

 Doina and Ion Aldea Teodorovici
 Dan Balan
 
 Natalia Barbu
 Maria Bieșu
 
 Nelly Ciobanu
 
 
 
 Anatol Dumitraș
 Nicolae Glib
 
 Patricia Kopatchinskaja
 Anastasia Lazariuc
 Arkady Luxemburg
 Gândul Mâței
 Andrew Rayel
 Sofia Rotaru
 Radu Sîrbu
 Pavel Stratan
 Cleopatra Stratan
 Nicolae Sulac
 Ion Suruceanu

Groups
 Alternosfera
 Arsenium
 Carla's Dreams
 Delta Pe Obraz
 DoReDos
 Infected Rain
 Noroc
 Orizont
 O-Zone
 SunStroke Project
 Zdob și Zdub

Musical institutions
Moldova's folk music and dance companies, troupes and orchestras are well known, especially Joc, an academic dance company; a joc is a celebration that includes dances, as well as the part of a town where the dancing takes place.

The Orchestra of Moldovan Folk Music and Dance was founded in 1949; the orchestra plays Romanian, Russian, Ukrainian, Polish, German music.

Music festivals in Moldova include The Faces of Friends, held in the town of Cahul; this festival was founded in 1996.

See also 
Moldova in the Eurovision Song Contest

References

External links

  Audio clips: Traditional music of Moldova. Musée d'ethnographie de Genève. Accessed November 25, 2010.
Moldavan folk music at NorocTV over 500 music videos
MSN Encarta (Archived 2009-11-01)

 
Moldova